Georgios Konstantinides (b. Trebizond, 1878 - d. Alexandria, 1919, nom de plume Skliros, «Σκληρός») was an early Greek socialist, who published realist writing on the common reality of his time  on the basis of the class structure of society and in order to analyse Greek society with Marxist tools, provoking discussions and struggles among the progressive circles of the day.

Biography
Skleros was born to a middle-class family of Trebizond in Ottoman Pontus, and took a typical education and cosmopolitan outlook for the city and its Greek quarter of that age, and in his younger years travelled to Odessa in Russia to work as a merchant. Later he left for Moscow, where he engaged in medical studies, in 1904, at the University of Moscow. The following year he got involved in the revolutionary movement, under the influence of Georgi Plekhanov, taking up the pseudonym of "Skliros" ("Severe"). A series of problems with the Tzarist establishment drove him to Estonia and then to Jena in Germany. There, as representative of Marxist theory he met with Dimitris Glinos in the "Filiki Prodevtiki Enosi" ("Friendly Progressive Unity"), a student society oriented in a socialist direction.

Skleros then moved to and lived in Alexandria, where he died in 1919.

Works
Το Κοινωνικόν μας Ζήτημα (Our Common Goal, 1907)
Η Φιλοσοφία του Πολέμου και της Ειρήνης (The Philosophy of War and of Peace)
Σύγχρονα Προβλήματα του Ελληνισμού (Contemporary Problems in Hellenism)
Μελέτες - παρεμβάσεις στα πολιτικά και πολιτιστικά δρώμενα (Plans - Interventions in Politics and Political Roles)

References

1878 births
1919 deaths
People from Trabzon
People from Trebizond vilayet
Pontic Greeks
Marxist writers
Greek Marxists
Greek socialists
Expatriates from the Ottoman Empire in the Russian Empire